Dreamhunter is the third studio album by the Swedish hard rock band Treat, released in 1987.

The band had only minor success with the album, but nevertheless managed to join the Monsters of Rock Tour 1988 in support of it. During the recording, drummer Leif Sundin left the band and was replaced by Jamie Borger, who would go on to be featured on every subsequent album.

Track listing
"Sole Survivor" (Anders Wikström, Robert Ernlund) - 5:05
"You're the One I Want" (Wikström, Ernlund) - 4:08
"Take Me on Your Wings" (Wikström, Ernlund) - 4:06
"Best of Me" (Wikström, Ernlund) - 5:26
"Dancing on the Edge" (Wikström, Ernlund) - 4:33
"Outlaw" (Wikström, Ernlund) - 4:52
"World of Promises" (Wikström, Ernlund) - 4:00
"One Way to Glory" (Wikström, Ernlund, Jamie Borger) - 4:36
"Save Yourself" (Wikström, Ernlund) - 4:36
"The Winner" (Wikström, Ernlund) - 3:39

Personnel
Band members
Anders Wikström - guitars, keyboards
Jamie Borger - drums, percussion
Lillen Liljegren - guitars
Robert Ernlund - lead vocals
Ken Siewertson - bass

Production
Albert Boekholt - producer, engineer, mixing
Albert Hartwig - assistant engineer
Atti Bauw - fairlight programing
Walter Hirsch - photography

References

Treat (band) albums
1987 albums
Mercury Records albums